The Lamberton Cabin is a historic summer cabin at 8 North Mountain in Bella Vista, Arkansas.  It is a roughly square single-story wood-frame structure with a low-pitch gable roof.  The roof is extended to the west by a shed-roofed sleeping porch, and there is an open deck to the east.  The roof extends significantly beyond the walls, much of which consist of screened sections (there are no windows).  The interior of the cabin, partitioned into living spaces, is further sheltered from the elements by the use of canvas shades.  Built c. 1920, this is one a handful of period cabins to survive in Bella Vista, and one of its least-altered.

The cabin was listed on the National Register of Historic Places in 1988.

See also
National Register of Historic Places listings in Benton County, Arkansas

References

Houses on the National Register of Historic Places in Arkansas
Houses completed in 1920
Houses in Benton County, Arkansas
National Register of Historic Places in Benton County, Arkansas
Buildings and structures in Bella Vista, Arkansas
1920 establishments in Arkansas